In Greek mythology, Crisus  or Crissus  (Ancient Greek: Κρῖσος) was a son of Phocus and twin brother of Panopeus. With Antiphateia, daughter of Naubolus, he became father of Strophius; thus he was the grandfather of Pylades. He is also said to have founded the town of Crissa, which received its name from him.

Notes

References 

 Pausanias, Description of Greece with an English Translation by W.H.S. Jones, Litt.D., and H.A. Ormerod, M.A., in 4 Volumes. Cambridge, MA, Harvard University Press; London, William Heinemann Ltd. 1918. . Online version at the Perseus Digital Library
 Pausanias, Graeciae Descriptio. 3 vols. Leipzig, Teubner. 1903.  Greek text available at the Perseus Digital Library.
 Stephanus of Byzantium, Stephani Byzantii Ethnicorum quae supersunt, edited by August Meineike (1790-1870), published 1849. A few entries from this important ancient handbook of place names have been translated by Brady Kiesling. Online version at the Topos Text Project.

Phocian characters in Greek mythology